The Embassy of Lebanon in London is the diplomatic mission of Lebanon in the United Kingdom.

The embassy is situated on Kensington Palace Gardens and was built in 1845-46 by Charles Frederick Oldfield and is a Grade II listed building.

References

External links
Official site

Lebanon
Diplomatic missions of Lebanon
Lebanon–United Kingdom relations
Buildings and structures in the Royal Borough of Kensington and Chelsea
Holland Park